Diana Frida  Arón Svigilisky (February 15, 1950 – November 18, 1974) was a Chilean journalist and a member of the Movimiento de Izquierda Revolucionaria. She was kidnapped, tortured and forcibly disappeared by agents of the Pinochet dictatorship.

Biography
She studied at the Hebrew Institute and then journalism at the Catholic University, developed her professional practice on Canal 13, belonging to the same university. After graduating, she worked as a reporter for Onda magazine of Editorial Quimantú. Arón was a member of the Movimiento de Izquierda Revolucionaria and as such she was part of the editorial team of El Rebelde newspaper.

Disappearance
After the 1973 military coup, Arón was forced to go underground. On November 18, 1974, she was arrested by agents of the Dirección de Inteligencia Nacional (DINA) (Chilean secret police) and taken to Villa Grimaldi, where she was tortured by Miguel Krassnoff, who was seen leaving the torture room with bloody hands, screaming "a Marxist, and on top of that, a Jew!". After that she was forcibly disappeared and her body was never found.

See also
List of kidnappings
List of people who disappeared

References

External links 
 Diana Arón en Una Historia Necesaria
Ernesto Carmona. Morir es la Noticia. Santiago de Chile: Ernesto Carmona Editor. 1998

1950 births
1970s missing person cases
1974 deaths
Chilean Jews
Chilean revolutionaries
Chilean socialists
Chilean women journalists
Enforced disappearances in Chile
Kidnapped people
Missing person cases in Chile
People killed in Operation Condor
Pontifical Catholic University of Chile alumni